Missile to the Moon is a 1958 independently made American black-and-white science fiction film drama, produced by Marc Frederic, directed by Richard E. Cunha, that stars Richard Travis, Cathy Downs, and K. T. Stevens. The film was distributed by Astor Pictures and is a remake of an earlier Astor Pictures-distributed film, Cat-Women of the Moon (1953). Missile to the Moon was released in late 1958 as a double feature with Cunha's Frankenstein's Daughter.

A spaceship blasts off from Earth with five aboard, but one of them is secretly a Moon man returning home. He dies by accident during the trip to Luna. What the remaining four find waiting for them when they arrive on the Moon is well beyond their expectations: huge rock creatures, giant lunar spiders, and a cave-dwelling civilization made up of beautiful women.

Plot
Two escaped convicts, Gary (Tommy Cook) and Lon (Gary Clarke), are discovered hiding aboard a rocket by scientist Dirk Green (Michael Whalen), who then forces them to pilot the spaceship to the Moon. Dirk, who is secretly a Moon man, wants to return home.

Dirk's partner Steve Dayton (Richard Travis) and Steve's fiancée June (Cathy Downs) are accidentally trapped aboard just before the rocketship blasts off from Earth.

Moon man Dirk is later accidentally killed in a meteor storm during the lunar trip. Once they land on the Moon, the spaceship's reluctant crew encounter deception and intrigue when they discover an underground kingdom made up of beautiful women and their sinister female ruler, the Lido (K. T. Stevens).

While on the Moon, the Earthers encounter surface-dwelling, slow-moving, bipedal large rock creatures that try to crush them. They must also contend with a cave-dwelling, not-so-giant spider that attacks them.

Cast
 Richard Travis as Steve Dayton
 Cathy Downs as June Saxton  
 K. T. Stevens as the Lido
 Tommy Cook as Gary
 Gary Clarke as Lon
 Michael Whalen as Dirk Green
 Nina Bara as Alpha
 Laurie Mitchell as Lambda
 Marjorie Hellen (Leslie Parrish) as Zema
 Henry Hunter as Colonel Wickers
 Lee Roberts as Sheriff Cramer
 Pat Mowry as Moon girl
 Tania Velia as Moon girl  
 Sanita Pelkey as Moon girl
 Lisa Simone as Moon girl
 Mary Ford as Moon girl 
 Marianne Gaba as Moon girl
 Sandra Wirth as Moon girl

Production
Missile to the Moon is an even lower-budget remake of the low-budget science fiction film drama Cat-Women of the Moon (1953) and closely follows the plot details of that earlier feature. That film offered 3D as its big attraction, but all its male characters were middle-aged. The 1958 remake opted to better appeal to a teenage audience by adding a pair of youthful escaped convicts, one a good kid who had made a mistake, the other an incorrigible crook, and providing them with lunar love interests in due course. In the 1953 film, the bit players portraying the minor Moon maidens are described as "Hollywood cover girls"; in the remake, they are credited as "international beauty contest winners".

A red camera filter was used to make the blue sky photograph very dark on the black-and-white film, but the result is still far from the ideal starry black. Bits of scrubby vegetation can be seen in the background of some shots. No attempt is made to convince the viewer that the Moon is an airless void where humans would weigh one-sixth their normal Earth weight. When one of the space-suited astronauts is forced into direct sunlight, unshielded from its intensity, he bursts into flames, despite the lack of an external oxygen atmosphere; in seconds he is reduced to a skeleton.

The large, slow-moving rock creatures have a passing resemblance to the shape of Gumby, the popular stop motion clay animation children's television character introduced in 1955.

The giant spider prop is wire-controlled from above; it is exactly the same "Moon spider" used five years earlier in Cat-Women of the Moon.

Nina Bara, who plays the evil, scheming, back-stabbing Alpha, was familiar to genre audiences from her role as Tonga on the television series Space Patrol (1950-1955). Popular 1960s/1970s television and film star Leslie Parrish also co-stars, billed under her real name Marjorie Hellen.

Reception and legacy
The film is regarded as a drive-in camp classic.

Film historians Kim R. Holston and Tom Winchester noted that the film was "... (a) low-budget, scientifically inaccurate hoot ..."

Film reviewer Glenn Erickson commented that "... 'Missile to the Moon' is nobody's idea of a good movie ... a hoot, a real knee-slapper, born MST3K material ... how can the worst space movie ever made, be the worst space movie ever made, if it's such a delight?"

Speaking of which, RiffTrax spoofed the film twice (one with Michael J. Nelson and improvisational comedy legend Fred Willard and the second time with Mike, Kevin Murphy and Bill Corbett; each in 2007).

See also
 List of American films of 1958
 List of killer arachnid films
 B movie

References

Notes

Citations

Bibliography

 Holston, Kim R. and Tom Winchester. Science Fiction, Fantasy and Horror Film Sequels, Series and Remakes: An Illustrated Filmography. Jefferson, North Carolina: McFarland & Company, 1997. .
 Jalufka, Dona A., Christian Koeber, Cesare Barbieri and Francesca Rampazzi, eds. "Moonstruck: How Realistic Is The Moon Depicted In Classic Science Fiction Films?""Proceedings, Earth-Moon Relationships Padova, Italy: Springer, 2001. .
 Johnson, John. Cheap Tricks and Class Acts: Special Effects, Makeup, and Stunts from the Films of the Fantastic Fifties. Jefferson, North Carolina: McFarland & Company, 1996. .
 Strick, Philip. Science Fiction Movies. New York: Octopus Books Limited, 1976..
 Warren, Bill. Keep Watching the Skies: American Science Fiction Films of the Fifties, 21st Century Edition. Jefferson, North Carolina: McFarland & Company, 2009. .

External links
 
 
 

 Original soundtrack for Missile to the Moon

1958 films
1950s English-language films
1950s monster movies
1950s science fiction films
American monster movies
American black-and-white films
American science fiction films
American space adventure films
Astor Pictures films
Films about spiders
Films directed by Richard E. Cunha
Films shot in California
Moon in film
Remakes of American films
1950s American films
1950s independent films